Navjot Chana (born 24 November  1983) is an Indian Judo Player who  won silver  medal in the men's 60 kg weight class at the 2014 Commonwealth Games at Glasgow. He hails from Hoshiarpur district of Punjab state of India. Chana is employed with Punjab Police
Chana defeated South Africa's Daniel Le Grange in the semi-final meeting. He had earlier defeated 23-year-old Tom Pappas of Australia in quarter-final.

References
List of Medal winners at Commonwealth Games Glasgow 2014

Living people
Indian male judoka
1983 births
People from Hoshiarpur
Judoka at the 2006 Asian Games
Judoka at the 2010 Asian Games
Commonwealth Games silver medallists for India
Judoka at the 2014 Asian Games
Indian male martial artists
Martial artists from Punjab, India
Commonwealth Games medallists in judo
Judoka at the 2014 Commonwealth Games
Asian Games competitors for India
21st-century Indian people
Medallists at the 2014 Commonwealth Games